David Blanasi ( – 2001?) was an Aboriginal man of the Mayali language group of west Arnhem Land, who is known for popularising the didgeridoo outside Australia, after appearing on television on the Rolf Harris show in 1967. He subsequently travelled the world playing his "mago" and was widely recognised for his skills.

Background
Blanasi was born around 1930. Blanasi is a corruption of his Aboriginal name, Bylanadji. He lived in south-central Arnhem Land in the Northern Territory, Australia, in a remote Aboriginal settlement variously known as Beswick also known as Wugularr, and in nearby Bamyili (now known as Barunga).

Blanasi first experimented with the didgeridoo at an early age, imitating the sounds of various animals, including the brolga, one of two animals representing the moieties of his clan. His father later taught him to improve his playing skills, as well as traditional methods of making musical instruments. Young Blanasi was known for always carrying his mago as he and his family wandered around the Kundirri area. He developed a reputation as a virtuoso player of traditional Kun-borrk (Gunborg) syncopation.

Blanasi travelled extensively from the 1950s onwards.

He first came to public attention as one of a number of traditional Aboriginal didgeridoo players and songmen recorded in 1961-62 by a US linguistic researcher La Mont West. These recordings were released commercially in 1963 on an LP record Arnhem Land Popular Classics.

In 1967 he became the first "full-blood" Aboriginal Australian to travel to England since 1792. There he appeared on television for the first time, giving didgeridoo-playing demonstrations for the popular Rolf Harris Show. Musical collaborations and tours with Rolf Harris followed, as well as Australian and international tours as part of a traditional dance troupe which variously included his lifelong partner and songmaster Djoli Laiwanga, and David Gulpilil, dancer and actor.

He later co-founded the "White Cockatoo Performing Group" in conjunction with his lifelong music partner, songmaster Djoli Laiwonga.

He taught the Australian-born entertainer Rolf Harris how to play the didgeridoo, Harris becoming perhaps the first notable non-Aboriginal Australian to master the instrument. A later student, in the late-1970s, was "Bambu-man" Ian MacFarlane, an electronic musician from Victoria with two solo LP albums. Ian lived with David's family at Bamyili and interviewed him, and was photographed outdoors playing with David and Djoli. Ian was presented with a new Bambu by David who said, on parting, "Baw Baw [Goodbye], Ian, I can't see your spirit anymore".

Blanasi is acknowledged as one of the great master mago (didgeridoo) players of the 20th century and as a master instrument maker his didgeridoos have become highly collectible.

Disappearance
In 1998 Djoli Laiwonga died, and Blanasi retired in solitude to a home in Bamyili. He went missing in August 2001, reportedly after going out to search for wood to be used in instrument-making. Newspaper coverage brought the situation into the public eye, and his disappearance generated widespread speculation. , no trace of Blanasi has been found. Although his body was never found, his family eventually held a funeral ceremony for him.

His grandson, Darryl Dikarrna, continues his tradition in the White Cockatoo Performing Group, after being appointed successor by his grandfather.

Films
1992 - Didjeridu with Charlie McMahon.  Directed by Jeni Kendell and Paul Tait. Gaia Films.

See also

List of didgeridoo players
Indigenous Australians
Indigenous music of Australia

References

External links
David Blanasi page

Indigenous Australian musicians
Musicians from the Northern Territory
Didgeridoo players
Place of birth missing
Year of birth uncertain
1930s births
2000s deaths
Year of death uncertain